Eilema albidula is a moth of the subfamily Arctiinae first described by Francis Walker in 1864. It is found in the Democratic Republic of the Congo, Nigeria and Sierra Leone.

References

Moths described in 1864
albidula
Insects of West Africa
Moths of Africa